The Unama'ki Institute of Natural Resources (UINR) is a non-profit organization located in the Mi'kmaq community of Eskasoni on Unama’ki (Cape Breton Island), Nova Scotia, Canada. UINR serves the five Mi'kmaq communities in Unama'ki–Eskasoni, Membertou, Potlotek, Wagmatcook, and Waycobah. Since its formation in 1999, the UINR Board of Directors has been made up of the five Unama’ki Chiefs.

UINR is responsible for Mi'kmaq natural resources and overseeing environmental issues in Cape Breton. Education of and enforcing policies for commercial  fisheries, forestry services, and resource management are among UINR's primary duties. Further areas of focus include aquatic research and stewardship, native species management, traditional Mi’kmaq knowledge, conserving all protected areas, monitoring of water quality, and establishing environmental partnerships.

The guiding principle that directs all of the work at UINR is a concept called Netukulimk, a Mi'kmaq word that loosely means 'sustainability'. It is about achieving adequate standards of community nutrition and economic well-being without jeopardizing the integrity, diversity or productivity of our environment.

UINR's integration of scientific research with Mi'kmaq traditional knowledge, practice and understanding is what makes UINR unique. UINR has signed Memorandum of Understandings to work together with many organizations including Environment Canada and Fisheries and Oceans Canada.

As stated on the UINR official website, the three goals of the organization are  governance, two-eyed seeing, and partnerships. The goal of governance lies in making networks for support and policy-enforcement available, to enable equal participation of Mi’kmaq in natural resource management, in Unama’ki and traditional territory. Two-eyed seeing is the continual strengthening of Mi’kmaw research and natural resource management, coming from the perspective of traditions and Mi’kmaw world views. Partnerships simply means to network with other groups who share similar goals, of conserving and protecting all natural resources for future generations.

References

Environmental organizations based in Nova Scotia
Natural resources organizations
Non-profit organizations based in Nova Scotia
Mi'kmaq in Canada